The 1984 Thailand Masters was a professional non-ranking snooker tournament held in August 1984 in Bangkok, Thailand.

Six players entered into a group phase with the two highest finishing players progressing into the final. Jimmy White won the tournament, defeating Terry Griffiths 4–3 in the final.

Main draw

Group stage

 Terry Griffiths 2–1 Steve Davis
 Terry Griffiths 2–0 Tony Meo
 Terry Griffiths 2–0 John Parrott
 Terry Griffiths 2–1 Sakchai Sim Ngam
 Terry Griffiths 2–0 Jimmy White

 Jimmy White 2–0 Tony Meo
 Jimmy White 2–0 John Parrott
 Jimmy White 2–0 Sakchai Sim Ngam
 Tony Meo 2–0 Steve Davis
 Tony Meo 2–0 John Parrott

 Tony Meo 2–0 Sakchai Sim Ngam
 John Parrott 2–0 Steve Davis
 John Parrott 2–0 Sakchai Sim Ngam
 Sakchai Sim Ngam 2–0 Steve Davis
 Steve Davis 2–0 Jimmy White

Final
 Jimmy White 4–3 Terry Griffiths

References

1984 in snooker
1984 in Thai sport
Sport in Thailand
August 1984 sports events in Thailand